Ahmed Hegazi (or Ahmed Gaffer Hegazi; احمد جعفر حجازى) (born May 31, 1948) is currently a Professor of Microbiology and Immunology in the department of Zoonotic Diseases, National Research Centre, Egypt. Prof. Hegazi received his master's degree in 1979, and his PhD in 1981. Hegazi's research work has been focused lately on bee products and their therapeutic effects.

Hegazi Organized and contributed to national and international research projects since 1977 and up till now; he has been the principal investigator on multiple research projects within the National Research Center. He has published 166 scientific papers and articles in national and international journals. He also served on the board of multiple national and international scientific journals.

Dr. Hegazi is also the president of the Egyptian Environmental Society for Uses and Production of Bee Products, secretary of the Egyptian Society of Apitherapy, secretary general of the African Federation of Apiculture Associations, and a member of the International Apitherapy Commission (APIMONDIA).

Awards
First Class Decoration of Excellence, Egypt, 1995
The Senior Scientist Prize of National Research Center, Cairo, Egypt, 1996
The National Scientific Prize In Biological Sciences, Egypt, 1990
The Scientific Prize of The National Research Center, Cairo, Egypt, 1989
The Second Best Research Paper Award, International Congress of Propolis, Bones Airs, Argentina, 2000
Main Speaker Award, 10th Academic Conference, PRA and NAS (Nippon Apitherapy Soc.) Japan, 2006
2 Bronze medals from The International Innovation Fair of the Middle East, Kuwait, 2007

Patents
Patent No. 8901 at 22/08/2006: A novel drug from natural products with new therapeutic modalities in treatment of psoriasis
Patent No. 1005 at 02/01/2006: A novel drug from natural resources for controlling Fascioliasis  
Patent No. 270: at 01/06/2005: A novel drug from medicinal plants with antiatherosclerotic (hypocholesterolaemic), antioxidant and cardio protective properties.
Patent No. 272: at 01/06/2005: A novel drug from natural resources with antiatherosclerotic (hypocholesterolaemic), antioxidant and cardio protective properties.

Scientific Activities
Referee  in the following International Journals:
Journal of Planta Medica, 2005
Journal of Evidence Based Complementary and Alternative Medicine, 2006
International Journal of Radiation Biology, 2007

References
Official Web Site
Apitherapy Organizations
Bee keeping database
the Apitherapy blog
The First German Apitherapy Course Manual

1948 births
Living people
Egyptian scientists
Apitherapists